Sanwlah was a court artist in the palace of 4th Mughal Emperor Jahangir.

References

Court Painters
Court painters